Daric William Barton (born August 16, 1985) is an American former professional baseball first baseman. He played in Major League Baseball (MLB) for the Oakland Athletics.

Minor league career
Barton was drafted by the St. Louis Cardinals in the 2003 Major League Baseball Draft in the 1st round as the 28th overall player selected. He was selected right out of Marina High School in Huntington Beach, California. Barton had signed on to attend Cal State Fullerton and play baseball there, but accepted a $1 million signing bonus from the Cardinals instead.

Barton began his professional career with the Johnson City Cardinals (Cardinals' Rookie League affiliate) in 2003, mainly playing as a catcher. In 54 games, he batted .291 with 4 home runs.

In 2004, he advanced to the Peoria Chiefs, the then Cardinals Single-A team. He played in just 90 games for the Chiefs, batting .313 with 13 home runs. He was named to the Midwest League Postseason All-Star team. He led the Midwest League in on-base percentage (.445), was third in the league in batting average (.313), and was fourth in the league in slugging percentage (.511).

On December 19, 2004, he was traded along with pitchers Dan Haren and Kiko Calero to the Oakland Athletics for starting pitcher Mark Mulder.
Barton was #32 out of 100 on Baseball America's Top 100 Prospects list in 2005. After having an emergency appendectomy part way through spring training, Barton started the 2005 season slowly, but ended the year with a .317 batting average. He spent most of 2005 with the Single-A Stockton Ports of the California League, but also appeared in 56 games for the Double-A Midland RockHounds of the Texas League. He was also selected to play in the All-Star Futures Game at PNC Park in Pittsburgh. With the Cardinals, Barton played catcher, but the Athletics moved Barton to first base due to concerns with Barton's ability behind the plate, the negative impact catching can have on the development of a young hitter, and because the Athletics had a number of more advanced catching prospects (Kurt Suzuki, Jeremy Brown, and Landon Powell).

In 2006, Barton once again appeared on Baseball America's Top 100 Prospects list, this time ranking at #28. He was also ranked as the Athletics' #1 prospect. He played for the Triple-A Sacramento River Cats in 2006, but due to injuries, played in only 43 games. He batted just .259 with 2 home runs in those 43 games.

In 2007, Barton appeared on Baseball America's Top 100 Prospects list, this time ranked at just #67. He was ranked as the Athletics' #2 prospect behind outfielder Travis Buck, who ranked at #50 on the Top 100 Prospects list. Barton began the 2007 season slowly with the Sacramento River Cats, hitting just .221 in April and .273 in May. He finally got started in June when he hit .454 in 27 games. He was named to the Pacific Coast League Mid-Season All-Star team on July 11. He finished the 2007 minor league season with a .293 batting average and 9 home runs in 137 games.

Following the 2007 minor league season, the River Cats advanced to the first round of the playoffs. They played the Salt Lake Bees, the Angels Triple-A affiliate. In the first round, Barton batted .550 (11–20) with 10 RBIs. He had a power surge with 4 home runs and one of the home runs was a decisive one in Game 5 as it led the River Cats into the second round of the playoffs. He did not join the team for the second round as he had his contract purchased by the Athletics major league club on September 10.

Major league career

Oakland Athletics
Barton made his major league debut on September 10, 2007, against the Seattle Mariners. In his third plate appearance, he had his first major league hit off Ryan Feierabend, a double.  He had two hits in his major league debut for Oakland, a feat that was not matched until Nate Freiman did it in 2013.

On September 14, Barton hit his first major league home run.  Barton played in 18 games in 2007. He reached base safely in all 18 games via a hit or a walk. He hit .347 (25–72) with 4 home runs and 8 RBIs.

In 2008, Barton was the Athletics' starting first baseman. He batted just .226 with 9 home runs and 47 RBIs in 140 games. During the All-Star break, Barton dove into a shallow pool and hit his head on the bottom. He suffered a jammed neck and had to get staples to close a cut on his head.

On April 5, 2009, the day before the A's season opener, Barton was demoted to Triple-A Sacramento.

Barton began the 2010 season as the A's starting first baseman.  On April 25, he fractured his finger while tumbling into the Cleveland Indians dugout. He won a Fielding Bible Award for his statistically based defensive excellence during the year  and led his team in runs (79), hits (152), and doubles (33). He also led the AL in walks with 110, and was second in MLB only to Prince Fielder.

Barton was once again selected as the starting first baseman for the Athletics at the beginning of the 2011 season. On June 22, the A's sent Barton back to Triple-A Sacramento to make room for Mark Ellis. Barton was hitting .212 with zero home runs at the time.  For the season, he batted .212 in 236 at bats.

On June 2, 2012, a struggling Barton was sent back to Triple-A. For the season, he batted .204.

On March 29, 2013, the A's designated Barton for assignment.

In May of the 2013 season, Barton was added back on the 40 man roster when right fielder Josh Reddick was placed on the disabled list after injuring his wrist. Everyday first basemen Brandon Moss was moved over to right field. Barton took Reddick's spot on the active roster and covered everyday first base duties. Barton was than designated for assignment again when Reddick returned. He was than outrighted to Triple-A Sacramento. On August 26, Barton was added to the 40-man roster again for the same reason.

On December 20, 2013, Barton signed a one-year deal with Oakland, avoiding arbitration. The Athletics designated Barton for assignment on May 15, 2014, when they acquired Kyle Blanks. In October 2014, Barton elected to become a free agent.

Toronto Blue Jays
On December 16, 2014, Barton signed a minor-league contract with the Toronto Blue Jays that included an invitation to spring training. He was assigned to the minor league spring training camp on March 30, 2015. On July 2, Barton was released. He batted .219 in 31 minor league games with the Triple-A Buffalo Bisons and Double-A New Hampshire Fisher Cats.

Pericos de Puebla
On April 1, 2016, Barton signed with the Pericos de Puebla of the Mexican Baseball League.
On September 14, 2016, Daric Barton and the Pericos de Puebla Won the Serie del Rey of the LMB (Mexican Baseball League). Barton was key to the Pericos winning their first championship
in over 30 years as he led the team with 21 HRs and despite missing 20 games with a broken finger was voted as the starting first baseman on the All-Star team, won the league Gold Glove for
his defense, and added 5 more home runs in the playoffs including the go ahead shot in the 6th inning of the Championship clinching game.

Acereros de Monclova
On February 21, 2017, Barton, along with Chad Gaudin, Manny Rodriguez, Nyjer Morgan, Rodolfo Amador, and Willy Taveras, were traded to the Acereros de Monclova in exchange for RHP Joaquín Lara. Barton only appeared in 26 games for the Acereros before spending the rest of the season on the reserve list.

Return to Puebla
On January 16, 2018, Barton was traded back to the Pericos de Puebla. He once again excelled with the team, finishing as one of the league leaders in average at .373 during the Spring Tournament of the 2018 season. Barton left the Pericos on August 6, 2018, halfway through the Fall Tournament, due to personal reasons and to prepare for the 2018-19 Mexican Pacific League season with the Charros de Jalisco. He retired as an active player following the LMP season.

Scouting report
Barton is a patient hitter. In 9 minor league seasons, he had 446 walks as opposed to 382 strikeouts. In 2010, Barton was one of only two players in MLB to have more walks than strikeouts, the other being Albert Pujols.

References

External links

1985 births
Living people
Acereros de Monclova players
American expatriate baseball players in Mexico
Arizona League Athletics players
Azucareros del Este players
American expatriate baseball players in the Dominican Republic
Baseball players from Vermont
Buffalo Bisons (minor league) players
Charros de Jalisco players
Johnson City Cardinals players
Major League Baseball first basemen
Mexican League baseball first basemen
Midland RockHounds players
New Hampshire Fisher Cats players
Oakland Athletics players
People from Springfield, Vermont
Peoria Chiefs players
Pericos de Puebla players
Phoenix Desert Dogs players
Sacramento River Cats players
Stockton Ports players